Awyi (Awye) is a Papuan language of Indonesian Papua. It is spoken in Arso District, Keerom Regency.

References

Border languages (New Guinea)
Languages of western New Guinea